Indra Rajya Lakshmi Devi Shah (25 July 1926 – 4 September 1950) was the consort and Crown Princess of Mahendra Bir Bikram Shah, then Crown Prince of Nepal. She was the mother of Kings Birendra Bir Bikram Shah and Gyanendra Bir Bikram Shah, Prince Dhirendra Bir Bikram Shah, and Princesses Shanti Rajya Lakshmi Devi, Sharada Rajya Lakshmi Devi and Shobha Rajya Lakshmi Devi.

Life 
She was the first wife Mahendra of Nepal (1920–1972). Crown Princess Indra belonged to the aristocratic Rana family and was the daughter of late Honorary General Hari Shamsher Jang Bahadur Rana and his wife, Megha Kumari Rajya Lakshmi.

She married Crown Prince Mahendra on 8 May 1940 as a teenager at 14, but died on 4 September 1950 at the age of 24. She bore three sons and three daughters before her early death. She succumbed to a post-partum haemorrhage, a complication following the birth of her sixth child, Dhirendra. The death of the Crown Princess led to the building of the kingdom's first maternity hospital, the Prasuti Griha, and her head-and-shoulders statue stands in the entrance of the hospital that was built in the grounds of Charburja Durbar and was opened on 17 August 1959.

Two years after Indra's death, her younger sister Ratna married Crown Prince Mahendra. There were no children by this marriage.

Ancestry

Royal Titles

References

External links
 
Image of Crown Princess Indra in this video

1926 births
1950 deaths
Deaths in childbirth
Nepalese princesses
20th-century Nepalese nobility
Nepalese Hindus